Sabar Upare Maa is a 1997 Bengali drama film directed by Swapan Saha.The film has been music composed by Anupam Dutta and Ashok Bhadra.

Cast
Chiranjeet Chakraborty
 Abhishek Chatterjee
 Subhendu Chatterjee
 Subhasish Mukhopadhyay
 Anamika Saha
 Rozina
 Biplab Chatterjee
 Aditi Chatterjee

References

External links
 Sabar Upare Maa on Gomolo
 

1997 drama films
1997 films
Bengali-language Indian films
Films scored by Anupam Dutta
Films directed by Swapan Saha
1990s Bengali-language films
Indian drama films